The Streets of New York  is a song originally published by M. Witmark & Sons. The song was from the musical comedy The Red Mill. The song was composed by Victor Herbert and typically plays at the end of Act II in The Red Mill.

History 
The song was composed by Victor Herbert to lyrics by Henry Blossom for The Red Mill in 1906.

The melody inspired the Oklahoma State University fight song, “Ride em’ Cowboys”, which was first published in by John K. Hall in 1923. The song is typical played by the Oklahoma State University Cowboy Marching Band during games.

Lyrics

References 

1906 songs
American songs